Florian Jamnig (born 11 November 1990) is an Austrian footballer who plays for Wacker Innsbruck.

Club career
On 30 July 2020, he returned to Wacker Innsbruck.

References

External links 
 

1990 births
Living people
Austrian footballers
Austria international footballers
WSG Tirol players
FC Wacker Innsbruck (2002) players
LASK players
SC Rheindorf Altach players
2. Liga (Austria) players
Austrian Football Bundesliga players
Association football midfielders